Allan Carlsson (17 April 1929 – 25 August 1953) was a Swedish cyclist. He competed in the individual and team road race events at the 1952 Summer Olympics.

References

External links
 

1929 births
1953 deaths
Swedish male cyclists
Olympic cyclists of Sweden
Cyclists at the 1952 Summer Olympics
Sportspeople from Norrköping
Road incident deaths in Sweden
Cycling road incident deaths
20th-century Swedish people